Elliott-Bester House is a historic home in Hagerstown, Washington County, Maryland, United States. It is a two-story brick dwelling, painted yellow and trimmed with black and white. The home is associated with Commodore Jesse D. Elliott who spent his boyhood years there.

It was listed on the National Register of Historic Places in 1975.

References

External links
, including photo from 1997, at Maryland Historical Trust

Houses on the National Register of Historic Places in Maryland
Houses completed in 1790
Houses in Hagerstown, Maryland
National Register of Historic Places in Washington County, Maryland